The 1873 Orkney and Shetland by-election was fought on 6–7 January 1873.  The by-election was fought due to the Death of the incumbent MP of the Liberal Party, Frederick Dundas.  It was won by the Liberal candidate, former Financial Secretary to the Treasury and Railway Administrator Samuel Laing.

References

1873 elections in the United Kingdom
1873 in Scotland
1870s elections in Scotland
19th century in Orkney
19th century in Shetland
Politics of Orkney
Politics of Shetland
By-elections to the Parliament of the United Kingdom in Scottish constituencies